Ruth Hollingsworth (29 August 1880 – 14 March 1945) was a British artist known for her landscapes, figure and flower paintings.

Biography
Hollingsworth was born in Clapham in London and was the fourth of five daughters born to Alexander Hollingsworth, a newspaper proprietor, and his wife Charlotte Ellen née Allen. Hollingsworth attended the Slade School of Art and the London School of Art. She lived in London and later at Dedham in Essex and painted landscapes in Breconshire and in Italy. Hollingsworth exhibited at the Royal Academy in London, with the New English Art Club, with the Society of Women Artists and elsewhere. In the 1930s she was a regular exhibitor with the Ipswich Art Club. In 1917 she married the artist Richard Sydney Hellaby and sometimes signed her works as Ruth Hellaby. A number of museums in Britain hold examples of her work and the collection of the Museum of New Zealand Te Papa Tongarewa includes two of her paintings, including a portrait of a young women, Odette.

References

External links
 
 

1880 births
1945 deaths
20th-century English artists
20th-century English women artists
Alumni of the Slade School of Fine Art
English women painters
Painters from London
People from Clapham